Municipal election for Dharan took place on 13 May 2022, with all 102 positions up for election across 20 wards. The electorate elected a mayor, a deputy mayor, 20 ward chairs and 80 ward members. An indirect election will also be held to elect five female members and an additional three female members from the Dalit and minority community to the municipal executive.

Independent candidate Harka Raj Rai was elected as the mayor of the sub-metropolitan city.

Background 

Dharan was established in 1958 as a municipality. The sub-metropolitan was created in 2014 by incorporating neighboring village development committees into Dharan municipality. Electors in each ward elect a ward chair and four ward members, out of which two must be female and one of the two must belong to the Dalit community.

In the previous election, Tara Subba from the CPN (Unified Marxist–Leninist) was elected as the mayor but after he died on 18 July 2018, Tilak Rai from the Nepali Congress was elected as mayor in a by-election in 2019.

Candidates

Opinion poll

Exit polls

Results

Mayoral election

Ward results 

|-
! colspan="2" style="text-align:centre;" | Political Party
! Ward Chairman
! Ward Members
|-
| style="background-color:;" |
| style="text-align:left;" |CPN (Unified Marxist-Leninist)
| style="text-align:center;" | 10
| style="text-align:center;" | 46
|-
| style="background-color:;" |
| style="text-align:left;" |Nepali Congress
| style="text-align:center;" | 7
| style="text-align:center;" | 30
|-
| style="background-color:;" |
| style="text-align:left;" |CPN (Maoist Centre)
| style="text-align:center;" | 1
| style="text-align:center;" | 4
|-
| style="background-color:;" |
| style="text-align:left;" |Rastriya Prajatantra Party
| style="text-align:center;" | 1
| style="text-align:center;" | 0
|-
| style="background-color:;" |
| style="text-align:left;" |Independent
| style="text-align:center;" | 1
| style="text-align:center;" | 0
|-
! colspan="2" style="text-align:right;" | Total
! 20
! 80
|}

Summary of results by ward

Council formation

See also 

 2022 Nepalese local elections
 2022 Lalitpur municipal election
 2022 Kathmandu municipal election
 2022 Janakpur municipal election
 2022 Pokhara municipal election

References 

Dharan